Bikkavolu is a village in East Godavari district in the state of Andhra Pradesh in India. The village is known for its famous Subrahmanya Swamy Temple.

Geography
It has an average elevation of 12 meters (42 feet).

Demographics
 India census, Biccavolu had population of 19,405. Males constitute 49% of the population and females 51%. Biccavolu has an average literacy rate of 70%, higher than the national average of 59.5%: male literacy is 75%, and female literacy is 66%.

References 

Villages in Biccavolu Mandal
Archaeological sites in Andhra Pradesh